Immaculate Conception Cathedral is a historic church at 1218 East Jefferson Street in Brownsville, Texas, United States.  It is the cathedral church for the Roman Catholic Diocese of Brownsville.  It was built in 1856 and added to the National Register of Historic Places in 1980 as Immaculate Conception Church.

History
The Missionary Oblates of Mary Immaculate were the first priests to celebrate Mass in the area of Brownsville in 1849.  The present Gothic Revival style building was designed by Peter Yves Keralum.  The Oblates operated a seminary in the rectory, which also was a haven for priests who fled the revolutions in Mexico.  The first Catholic bishop to reside at Immaculate Conception was Dominic Manucy who was the Vicariate Apostolic of Brownsville.  The Vicariate became the Diocese of Corpus Christi in 1912.  On July 10, 1965 Pope Paul VI established the Diocese of Brownsville from Corpus Christi and Immaculate Conception became the cathedral for the new diocese.

See also

List of Catholic cathedrals in the United States
List of cathedrals in the United States
National Register of Historic Places listings in Cameron County, Texas
Recorded Texas Historic Landmarks in Cameron County

References

External links

Official Cathedral Site
Roman Catholic Diocese of Brownsville Official Site 

Roman Catholic Diocese of Brownsville
Gothic Revival church buildings in Texas
Roman Catholic churches completed in 1856
Buildings and structures in Brownsville, Texas
Churches on the National Register of Historic Places in Texas
Immaculate Conception, Brownsville
Churches in Cameron County, Texas
National Register of Historic Places in Cameron County, Texas
Recorded Texas Historic Landmarks
19th-century Roman Catholic church buildings in the United States